Isabel Atkin (born 21 June 1998) is a British-American freestyle skier who competes internationally for Great Britain.
She won bronze at  women's slopestyle at the 2018 Winter Olympics in Pyeongchang, the first British Olympic medal in skiing.

Early life
Atkin was born in Boston, United States to English father Mike and Malaysian mother Winnie. She has a younger sister Zoe Atkin who is also a freestyle skier. She started learning to ski on Sugarloaf Mountain in Maine when she was three. In order to help with her skiing, her family moved to Park City, Utah when she was 14 to attend the Winter Sports School whose academic calendar runs from April to November so that she may ski in the winter. She enrolled at Colorado College in 2017.

Skiing career
Atkin has dual British and US nationality, but joined the GB Park & Pipe programme, and started competing for Great Britain when she was 15 during the 2013–2014 season. In 2017, she competed in the ski slopestyle World Cup competition at Silvaplana, and became the first British woman to win a World Cup event in ski slopestyle.
She competed at the FIS Freestyle Ski and Snowboarding World Championships 2017 in Sierra Nevada, Spain, where she won bronze in slopestyle. In January 2018, she won bronze at the ski slopestyle World Cup held in Aspen Snowmass, Colorado.

2018 Winter Olympics
At the 2018 Winter Olympic Games at Pyeongchang, South Korea, she scored 84.60 points in her final run to win a bronze in slopestyle. Her win is considered Great Britain's first medal won by a skier at the Olympics – the previous British skier Alain Baxter was stripped of his bronze medal in the slalom at the 2002 Winter Olympics after testing positive in a drug test.

References

External links

1998 births
Living people
British female freestyle skiers
Freestyle skiers at the 2018 Winter Olympics
Olympic freestyle skiers of Great Britain
Medalists at the 2018 Winter Olympics
Olympic bronze medallists for Great Britain
Olympic medalists in freestyle skiing
Sportspeople from Boston
British people of Malaysian descent
American people of English descent
American people of Malaysian descent
American emigrants to the United Kingdom